Zayandeh Rud Cultural and Recreational Village (– Dehkadeh-ye Farhengī-ye Tafrīḩī-ye Zāyandeh Rūd) is a village in Kaveh Ahangar Rural District, in the Central District of Chadegan County, Isfahan Province, Iran. At the 2006 census, its population was 52, in 15 families.

References 

Populated places in Chadegan County